Aberystwyth University Students' Union is the students' union of Aberystwyth University. It is affiliated to the National Union of Students of the United Kingdom and NUS Wales/UCM Cymru.

It is one of the oldest and most active student unions in the UK. It hosted the first NUS UK national conference. Today it still plays a crucial role in upholding the interests of students in Aberystwyth, in Wales and across the UK. The student advice centre offers support services to all students and is able to cover a wide range of subjects such as stress, sexual health and immigration.

In addition to academic representation, campaigns and student support, it oversees a wide range of volunteering, sports clubs and societies.

History

The predecessor to the Union, the  Aberystwyth Student Representative Council, was founded in 1900 by Herbert John Fleure, who later went to become a lecturer in botany, geology and zoology at the university. The SRC was based in the common room in the basement of the Old College, was democratically elected and produced The Dragon, and later The Courier, as student newspapers. In 1966, student representation on various college committees was introduced, increasing student involvement in college administration.

In 1923, the former Aberystwyth Assembly Rooms at 10 Laura Place were bought by the Old Students' Association with funds it had raised to mark the college jubilee. The rooms were to form part of a memorial to the students from Aberystwyth who died in the First World War, and hosted the new Students' Union. The building was officially opened on 30 October 1923 by the then-Prince of Wales, Edward (later to become the Duke of Windsor). The event was marked by the unveiling of the only public statue of Edward in the United Kingdom.
During the 1950s, an adjacent house was purchased to be the "Students Union Annexe", as increasing numbers of students came to Aberystwyth. 
As part of the university's expansion onto the present site, the first wing of the new Students' Union building on the new Penglais campus was opened in 1970. The use of 10 Laura Place and the Annexe ceased in 1984, when the final stage of the new building on Penglais campus was finished. 10 Laura Place was refurnished for use as a music centre, and the Annexe sold for private housing. In 2011, 10 Laura Place was re-opened as a 24-hour computer room.

The union was renamed Aberystwyth Guild of Students in 1972, after the university's Union merged with the Unions of the College of Further Education, College of Librarianship and the Welsh College of Agriculture. In 2012, the Guild reverted to the name Aberystwyth University Students' Union.

Operations

Officers 
The union has 5 full-time sabbatical officers, and 13 part-time officers.
All officer positions are elected in cross-campus elections every spring.

Liberation and Section Officers (LGBT+, BME, Women's, Disabled, Mature, Postgraduate, and International) are elected solely by students who self-define into each respective category, and candidates for these positions must likewise self-define to be eligible to stand.

Sports and societies 
As of 2022, there are 48 sports clubs and 76 societies affiliated to the union. These range from more traditional sports like rugby, football, cricket and hockey, to American football, cheerleading and Ultimate Frisbee, as well as country-based sports such as clay pigeon shooting and horse riding.  The societies range from more national movements such as Amnesty International to casual and hobby-based societies such as the chess society or Exploding Fish (improvisational performance) to political organistations such as Labour and the Lib Dems. A full list can be found on the website. Most people join these groups at the annual Freshers Fairs held in the first week of term usually in late September, or at the ReFreshers Fair, which is usually held at the beginning of February.

Debating Union

The Aberystwyth Debating Union is a society run by students to foster the use of debate as a means of exploring ideas. The society was formed in 1872 and the first president was Idris Evans. Since then many students have been active in the society including former president of the Debating Union Emlyn Hooson QC, who went on to become Chairman of the Liberal Party in Zanzibar.

In the early 2000s the society experienced a lull in activity; however, in 2006 Michael Keary reinvigorated the society, with teams being trained and sent to external competitions once again.

Union members Ollie Newlan and Roberto Sarrionandia became the first team from a Welsh institution to reach the Quarter Finals of the World Universities Debating Championships, after doing so at the annual competition in Berlin, 2013.

The Debating Union is the university's oldest society and is set to celebrate 150 years of existence in 2022

Theatre Societies
The Students' Union is notable for the number of drama and theatre societies available to its members.

The oldest of these, The Nomadic Players, was founded in 1999 and focuses solely on established 'straight' plays. The Nomadic Players produce, on average, four shows a year. Plays produced by the Nomads include A Midsummer Night’s Dream by William Shakespeare, The Duchess of Malfi by John Webster, David Mamet's Sexual Perversity in Chicago and Alice by Laura Wade. The society has also successfully produced Moira Buffini's play Dying For It, and Willy Russell's Stags and Hens. The society's aim is to carry on providing high quality performances and give students the opportunity to further their acting experience.

Broad-Ways Theatre & Film Society (founded 2009) provides a platform for undergraduates, post-graduates and even assistant non-students to write their own original productions, in theatre, film and multimedia forms. As the only society to supply opportunities for original independent and team-written script-writing, film-making, and multimedia theatre, Broad-Ways stages four to five shows per year. These involve feature-length Independent Productions, in theatre and/or film forms; a Collaborative Project, which focuses on team-written multimedia; the One-Acts festival, a collection of several short theatre pieces that has been annually performed at the Canolfan Arad Goch; and the Film Festival, a collection of several film shorts that has a one-night showing at the Aberystwyth Arts Centre.

Broad-Ways is also known for its fund-raising events for charities such as World Wide Fund for Nature and Macmillan Cancer Support, and its weekly Makers Meetings, where artists from all forms can create in a free and open space. Several of Broad-Ways' former members and writers have gone on to work both independently and professionally within theatre and film, notably Lewis Gibson-Grainger and Aaron Small, whose original Indie Project script, Vermis, is currently under production by The Co-Operative British Youth Film Academy. Broad-Ways devotes itself to providing students of any study vast opportunities in the many areas of film, theatre, scenography, and writing.

Curtain Call Musical Theatre Society, founded in 2006, typically produces two large scale shows a year with smaller showcases taking place throughout the year. These showcases are usually held in the Student Union. The society's original aim was to provide more opportunities for Aberystwyth students to be physically involved with creating musical theatre. In its formative years the company did not purely produce musical theatre but also 'straight' plays such as Michael Frayn's Noises Off. Curtain Call has produced sell-out runs of shows such as Jonathan Larson's RENT, Little Shop of Horrors and a successful production of Our House, based on the music of Madness. The society's mission today is still to give opportunities to all student and associate members to participate in producing musical theatre. Past members of Curtain Call are now working professionally in the West End and regionally, most notably the society's founding president Alan Mehdizadeh who made his West End debut in Billy Elliot the Musical at The Victoria Palace Theatre, London in 2013, and in 2016 took over the role of Don in Kinky Boots the Musical,(also on London's West End). Other former members have since gone on to work at venues such as The Royal Albert Hall, The Royal Opera house and in film and television. In May 2014 Curtain Call became the first ever university society to perform in the main house of Aberystwyth Arts Centre with their production of Fame which also featured the brief return of Mehdizadeh to the society.

Exploding Fish are the only improvisation and devising society in Aberystwyth. Holding weekly workshops and bi-weekly performances, they are devoted to creating a fun, friendly environment in which everyone can understand improvisation better and improve on life skills such as confidence and quick thinking. They also regularly perform full length devised productions at the Arad Goch.

Student Media
The Courier is a student newspaper voluntarily run by students of Aberystwyth University. Established in 1948, it has undergone many changes in style and format since then, and for most of the early Noughties was a magazine. Following a year of not printing the magazine due to financial reasons, it was relaunched as a tabloid by a new committee in the academic year 2011/12. The Courier has complete editorial independence from both the Students' Union and the University, and printing is funded exclusively by advertising.

The Students' Union Building contains a radio studio, used to broadcast the student digital "Bay Radio" station, with live shows and presenters during the daytime.

At the beginning of the 2012 academic year, the three existing student media operations (The Courier, Bay Radio and Aber TV, now Bay TV) merged to form Aberystwyth Student Media, which is to produce integrated media content across all three, along with Online. Yr Heriwr (The Challenger) was also established as a separate Welsh-language student paper.

As mentioned in the above Theatre Societies, Broad-Ways Theatre & Film Society is currently the only society within Aberystwyth that produces opportunities for original screenplay writing, team-writing, multimedia films, feature films and short films. These are showcased in the annual Collaborative Projects, Independent Projects, One Acts Festivals, and Film Festivals. The media reach of the society also includes opportunities to be involved with the Makers Meetings, which are set up as workshops to help out potential film-makers and screenplay writers, as well as covering other art forms and mediums.

The oldest continuously running society at the university is The Elizabethan Madrigal Singers, the university's Chamber Choir, who were founded in 1950 and continue to perform over sixty years later.

Commercial services 
The Student Union building contains a shop which sells stationery, snacks, branded men's and women's clothing and accessories, and also sells union events tickets. A bakery, "Briwsion", is located inside the Union Shop.  The newly decorated Cwtch bar with its Starbucks alongside its Nosh Da bar meals and take away service. The commercial services inside the Union building are operated by the university leaving the Union to focus its service delivery onto students services.

External links 
 Official English-Language website of Aberystwyth University Students' Union
 Official Welsh-Language website of Aberystwyth University Students' Union

References 

Aberystwyth University
Students' unions in Wales